The Presidents' Athletic Conference men's basketball tournament is the annual conference basketball championship tournament for the NCAA Division III Presidents' Athletic Conference. It is a single-elimination tournament and seeding is based on regular season records.

The winner, declared conference champion, receives the PAC's automatic bid to the NCAA Men's Division III Basketball Championship.

Results
 Record is incomplete prior to 2002

Championship records
Results incomplete before 2002

 Franciscan has not yet qualified for the tournament final.
 Schools highlighted in pink are former members of the PAC.

References

NCAA Division III men's basketball conference tournaments
Basketball Tournament, Men's